Kalinik II was Archbishop of Peć and Serbian Patriarch from 1765 to 1766. He was the last holder of that office before the Ottoman Empire abolished the Serbian Patriarchate of Peć in 1766. As an ethnic Greek, he was seen as a foreigner among Serbs, who favored the deposed patriarch Vasilije I. Since his tenure was marked by various internal conflicts, Kalinik decided to resign his post, and even went a step further: he sent a pre-agreed petition to the Ecumenical Patriarch of Constantinople asking for the abolition of the Serbian Patriarchate of Peć, citing accumulated debts as the main reason for this motion, signed by him and 5 other bishops. On 11 September 1766, the Ecumenical Patriarch of Constantinople convinced the Sultan to abolish the Serbian Patriarchate of Peć and place its dioceses under the jurisdiction of Constantinople. That decision affected only Serbian dioceses under Ottoman rule, since Serbian Autonomous Metropolitanate of Karlovci in Habsburg monarchy remained out of reach of Constantinopolitan Phanariotes.

References

Sources

External links
 Official site of the Serbian Orthodox Church: Serbian Archbishops and Patriarchs

Kalinik II
18th-century Eastern Orthodox bishops
Serbian people of Greek descent
18th-century Greek people